Kiataussaq Island is an uninhabited island in Avannaata municipality in northwestern Greenland.

Geography 
To the north of the island, only small skerries of diminishing size dot the surface of southern Melville Bay. The island is rocky, culminating in an unnamed  peak in the western part of the island.

Skerries 
Kiataussaq Island is surrounded by several skerries in the north and west: collectively known as Kiataussaq Skerries:

 Qaarusulik
 Qeqertannguit
 Natsiarsiorfik
 Nanotralikassak
 Qilalukiarfik
 Uvingassoq
 Qamutikassait

References 

Uninhabited islands of Greenland
Melville Bay
Islands of the Upernavik Archipelago